Herbert Saul Wilf (June 13, 1931 – January 7, 2012) was a mathematician, specializing in combinatorics and graph theory.  He was the Thomas A. Scott Professor of Mathematics in Combinatorial Analysis and Computing at the University of Pennsylvania.  He wrote numerous books and research papers. Together with Neil Calkin he founded  The Electronic Journal of Combinatorics in 1994 and was its editor-in-chief until 2001.

Biography 
Wilf was the author of numerous papers and books, and was adviser and mentor to many students and colleagues. His collaborators include Doron Zeilberger and Donald Knuth. One of Wilf's former students is Richard Garfield, the creator of the collectible card game Magic: The Gathering. He also served as a thesis advisor for E. Roy Weintraub in the late 1960s.

Wilf died of a progressive neuromuscular disease in 2012.

Awards 
In 1998, Wilf and Zeilberger received the Leroy P. Steele Prize for Seminal Contribution to Research for their joint paper, "Rational functions certify combinatorial identities" (Journal of the American Mathematical Society, 3 (1990) 147–158).  The prize citation reads: "New mathematical ideas can have an impact on experts in a field, on people outside the field, and on how the field develops after the idea has been introduced.  The remarkably simple idea of the work of Wilf and Zeilberger has already changed a part of mathematics for the experts, for the high-level users outside the area, and the area itself." Their work has been translated into computer packages that have simplified hypergeometric summation.

In 2002, Wilf was awarded the Euler Medal by the Institute of Combinatorics and its Applications.

Selected publications

 
 
 
 
 1971: (editor with Frank Harary) Mathematical Aspects of Electrical Networks Analysis, SIAM-AMS Proceedings, Volume 3,American Mathematical Society 
 1998: (with N. J. Calkin) "The Number of Independent Sets in a Grid Graph", SIAM Journal on Discrete Mathematics

Books 
 A=B (with Doron Zeilberger and Marko Petkovšek)
 Algorithms and Complexity
 generatingfunctionology.
 Mathematics for the Physical Sciences
 Combinatorial Algorithms, with Albert Nijenhuis

Lecture notes
 East Side, West Side
 Lectures on Integer Partitions
 Lecture Notes on Numerical Analysis (with Dennis Deturck)

See also
Line graph

References

External links
 Herbert Wilf's homepage
 Wilf's obituary at the University of Pennsylvania
 
 
 The Electronic Journal of Combinatorics

1931 births
20th-century American mathematicians
21st-century American mathematicians
Combinatorialists
University of Pennsylvania faculty
Mathematicians at the University of Pennsylvania
2012 deaths
The American Mathematical Monthly editors
American textbook writers